Eotrigonobalanus is an extinct genus of deciduous trees in the family Fagaceae. This genus is known in the fossil record from the Late Eocene to the Latest Oligocene.

Bibliography

References

Fagaceae
Prehistoric angiosperm genera